Giacomo Romano Davare (born 2 July 1945, Alcamo, Italy) is an Italian writer, actor, stage director and teacher.

Biography
Davare was born in Alcamo, in the province of Trapani in 1945; he is an actor, stage director, writer, lyricist, composer and songwriter. After getting the high school diploma, he has been navigating worldwide for three years as a sea captain; later he graduated in Economy and Commerce, qualifying as a certified accountant.

After winning a competition for teaching, he taught Applied Mathematics in Commercial Technical Institutes, first in Alcamo, then in Lecco and finally in Morbegno, in the province of Sondrio; later he became a headmaster in high schools.

In 1973, with a literary article on Il Secolo d'Italia, he started a long series of publications which included novels, poems, essays and various dramas, works that are catalogued in National libraries and in those of theatrical companies in Europe, United States and Australia; later he published artiche in different magazines and newspapers, such as Il Giornale di Sicilia, Romagna, Rivista Teatro, Corriere della Valtellina, Cultura di destra. Finally, he collaborated with University of Milano-Bicocca for Italian teachers traineeship (TFA).

In 1976, thanks to his artistic experience with Filodrammatica in the Church of Saint Anne (Alcamo), he founded Piccolo Teatro di Alcamo; after his transfer in Lombardy, he has been the artistic director of  Compagnia Piccolo Teatro delle Valli of Morbegno (Sondrio) since 1983.
He has directed more than one hundred plays for Piccolo Teatro of Alcamo and Piccolo Teatro delle Valli of Sondrio, with a greater propensity for classical authors like Sophocles, Shakespeare, Molière, Goldoni, Pirandello, Cechov, Ibsen, T. Wilder, T.S. Eliot and Arthur Miller.
He has been politically committed, as he first supported the M.S.I.(Italian Social Movement) and later A.N. National Alliance (Italy), where he covered the office of provincial president; he was an administrator in the province of Trapani and Sondrio, and also a member of the BIM (Bacino imbrifero montano) of Sondrio.

Prizes and acknowledgments
Davare has won, or been mentioned, in various Italian literary contests:  
Premio Federico II, Palermo 1970
Premio Martin Luther King, Civitavecchia 1977
Premio Giacomo Arnò, Naples, 1979
Fragmenta d'oro for theatre, Rome 1985
Carlo Alianello for edited poetry, Sibari 1989
Premio nazionale Histonium for narrative, Vasto 2003
"Premio migliore regia" at the theatre contest of San Costantino Calabro for the play "Tre sull'altalena" by Lunari (agosto 2006)
Premio Speciale Gatal (2011) for his theatrical activity 
Ghitakos for Essays, Athens 2013
Premi Letterari "N. Giordano Bruno – XXII edition" and "Amici della Sapienza – Speciale Scuola XVIII edition", December 2014 (as Meritorius for culture, art, tourism and solidarity) 
Special Mention at Premio Letterario Casentino 2016
Fifth classified at "Premio Internazionale Michelangelo Buonarroti", Serravezza 2016
Prize of merit assigned by Premio letterario internazionale Montefiore (7th edition) for his essay "Chi era Enrico IV?" (September 2017)
Finalist at Premio Internazionale Michelangelo Buonarroti 3rd edition, Serravezza november 2017 
International Prize (Premio internazionale) Talenti Vesuviani: assigned PREMIO SPECIALE LEGALITA (Naples, 2017)
Honorable Mention at the 2nd Premio Artistico-letterario Internazionale al femminile "Maria Cumani Quasimodo" (2018) 
Mention of highest literary merit assigned by the Associazione Artistica Culturale "Accademia degli Artisti", Premio Letterario internazionale Golden Books Awards 2018 in collaboration with Umberto Soletti editor, 19 May 2018
Premio Internazionale Michelangelo Buonarroti 4th edition: Diploma d'onore con menzione d'onore (Single Poems section), Forte dei Marmi, November 2018 
Premio Internazionale Michelangelo Buonarroti 4th edition: Diploma d'onore con menzione d'onore (Tales section) with the work Le Voci nel Camino), Forte dei Marmi, November 2018 
Finalist (with a special mention) at the 3rd edition of Concorso Nazionale Letterario "Un fiorino d'Inverno-Gli Editi" (Monterotondo, 23 February 2019)
Finalist at Concorso Tra un fiore colto e l'altro donato, March 2019
Merit Diploma by the 'Associazione Artistica Culturale "Accademia degli Artisti", Premio Letterario internazionale Golden Books Awards 2018 (in collaborazione con Umberto Soletti editore), 15 April 2019
3rd classified: Premio Internazionale M.Cumani Quasimodo Centro Europeo Toscolano, 12 May 2019 (for Essays and degree thesis)
Honorable Mention at Premio Letterario Nazionale Città di Ascoli Piceno (1st Edition, Poetry): 7 September 2019
Finalist at the 3rd Concorso CET (Centro Europeo di Toscolano, Scuola Autori di Mogol), 23 November 2019
3º classificato at the 5th Premio Internazionale S.Quasimodo, Premio Speciale sez.Faretra, Centro Europeo Toscolano, 11 January 2020
Premio della Critica narrativa edita al Concorso Nazionale di Poesia e Narrativa Talenti Vesuviani (14th edition), (San Giorgio a Cremano, Naples, 13 December 2020);
1º Premio Internazionale Dostoevskij 2020: 
1st classified (premio Faretra) (section edited Novels) with the novel Il Ferro di Cavallo; 
2nd classified (section Poetry and Narrative) with the text Drammi; 
3rd classified (section unedited novels) with Le due Isole;
2º classified at Premio Letterario Fortuna (7th edition) in the  Narrative Section, Bari 5 September 2021;
Special Prize, Section Historical Novel, with Il Ferro di Cavallo in the 9th edition of the International Contest for Poetry and  Narrative Le Grazie Porto Venere la Baia dell’Arte, organized by the Association ‘Il Volo dell’Arte’ (3rd October 2021).

Member of Accademia Ferdinandea of Catania.
Knight of the International Confederation Knights Crusader of Malta (2003)

Works
Il potere e la croce: a trilogy; Palermo: Thule, 1999
Bruto figlio di Cesare (a drama, with an introduction by Gennaro Malgieri); Palermo: Thule, 1977
Anche il silenzio tace: poems; Palermo: Thule, 1981
Il buco grigio (an essay-enquiry on the essence of thought through the analysis of the logical circuits of our mind); Firenze libri, 1989
Guida alla didattica del «Far teatro»; Editore: Nuovi Autori; 1990, Genere: arti ricreative. spettacolo. sport
Più forte che la rivoluzione; Palermo: Thule, 19..
Eolia (a novel on navigation); Firenze: L'Autore Libri, 1993
L'inverno passerà presto: a drama in 2 acts and 4 scenes; translated in Russian by Monica Ferrante, music by Fausto Cannone, introduction by Teresa Rizzo,  afterword by Tommaso Romano; Milan; Nuovi Autori, 1994
Via Mazzini: a comedy in three acts; Palermo: Thule, 1997
Ciullo d'Alcamo: a historical drama in 2 acts and 5 scenes (with an introduction by Giuseppe Cottone); Palermo: Thule, 1998
Dietro il cancello: a drama in 2 acts; Palermo: Thule, 1999
1:Il sangue dei martiri: a historical drama in 2 acts; Palermo: Thule, 1999 (Is a part of: Il potere e la croce, trilogy) 
L'ala spezzata del destino; Pescara: Tracce, 2002
Il favo delle api: a fable in 2 acts with songs; Palermo: Thule, 2003
L'onore di Bice: giallo vergognosamente comico in due atti, un prologo e un'anteprima; Palermo: Thule, 2005
Il teatro dell'anima: storia della drammaturgia moderna nell'esperienza di alcuni protagonisti, by Giacomo Romano Davare and Manuel Davare; Firenze: Atheneum, 2007
Il teatro dell'anima. Educare al teatro, educare con il teatro; Editore: Firenze Atheneum, Collana: Collezione Oxenford, 2007
Anima profonda: articoli e saggi critici (1973–2002) di Giacomo Romano Davare; with an introductive text by Tommaso Romano: Parola creativa e azione teatrale nell'opera di Giacomo Romano Davare; Palermo: Thule, 2010
Le voci nel camino (stories); Edizioni L'Autore Libri Firenze, 2011 
Torna a volare libero, gabbiano: a drama in 2 acts; Palermo: Thule, 2011
Prima che il treno passi, a drama
Molière didattico: translations of the comedies Le Saccenti and IL Tartufo; Palermo: Thule, 2013
Teatro: Maschera e specchio della civiltà occidentale; Ed. Firenze Atheneum; Collana: Collezione Oxenford, 2014
Le interrelazioni sociali nel teatro, Rivista Teatro, Milan 
Il potere e l'anima: a trilogy of Giacomo Romano Davare; music by Fausto Cannone; Palermo: Thule, 2014
Le fiabe teatrali: dove vai Cherry Brown; L'uccellino blu; Palermo: Thule, 2015
Chi era Enrico Quarto? Europa Edizioni Roma; Collana: Edificare universi, 2015
Il professore e il magistrato; Europa Edizioni, Collana: Edificare universi, 2017
Il ferro di cavallo; Europa Edizioni, Collana: Edificare universi, 2020

See also
Benedetto Lo Monaco
Alcamo
Morbegno
Italian Social Movement

References

Sources

External links

People from Alcamo
Italian educators
21st-century Italian writers
Italian theatre directors
1945 births
20th-century Italian poets
Living people
20th-century Italian male writers